Rayyanah Barnawi is a biomedical researcher and Saudi astronaut, selected for Axiom Mission 2 as a Mission Specialist by the Saudi Space Commission; her selection was officially announced on February 12, 2023.

She holds a Bachelor's degree in biomedical sciences from University of Otago. She also holds a Master's degree in Biomedical Sciences from Alfaisal University, where she studied the adhesion of breast cancer stem cells; she has a nine years of experience in cancer stem cells research. When she was selected she was working as a research laboratory technician at the King Faisal Specialist Hospital and Research Centre in Riyadh. It is expected that, as part of the upcoming mission, she will be conducting mission experiments in her field.

References

 

21st-century Saudi Arabian women scientists
Living people
People from Riyadh
Saudi Arabian astronauts
Year of birth missing (living people)